A Kid for Two Farthings may refer to:
 A Kid for Two Farthings (novel)
 A Kid for Two Farthings (film)